A psychedelic is a psychoactive drug that alters cognition and perception.

Psychedelic may also refer to:

Psychology and healthcare
 Psychedelic experience, a temporary altered state of consciousness induced by the consumption of psychedelics
 Psychedelic therapy, therapeutic practices involving the use of psychedelics, primarily to assist psychotherapy

Culture and society
 Psychedelia, a subculture surrounding the psychedelic experience
 Psychedelic era, a time of social and cultural change related to psychedelia between the early 1960s and the mid-1970s

Arts, entertainment, and media
 Psychedelic art, art inspired by the psychedelic experience
 Psychedelic film, a film genre influenced by psychedelia
 Psychedelic literature, literature related to psychedelics
 Psychedelic music, popular music connected to psychedelia, aiming to replicate or enhance the psychedelic experience
 Psychedelic folk, originating in the mid-1960s
 Psychedelic funk, originating in the late 1960s
 Psychedelic pop, originating in the mid-1960s
 Psychedelic rock, originating in the mid-1960s
 Psychedelic soul, originating in the late 1960s
 Psychedelic trance (also known as psytrance or simply psy), originating in the late 1990s
 Psychedelia (film), a 2015 film

Other uses
 Psychedelic frogfish, named for its appearance

See also 

 Psychotropic
 Shagadelic
 
 
 Psy (disambiguation)
 Psych (disambiguation)
 Psyche (disambiguation)
 Psycho (disambiguation)